D.J. Campbell may refer to:

DJ Campbell (born 1981), an association footballer
D.J. Campbell (American football) (born 1989), American football safety